Mariana Ugalde Campo (born 7 January 1993) is a Mexican badminton player. She competed at the 2010 Summer Youth Olympics. Ugalde was part of Mexican winning team at the 2010 and 2018 Central American and Caribbean Games, and also a runner-up in 2014. In the individual event, she has collected a silver and two bronze medals in the women's doubles and another two bronze medals in the women's singles during her participation at the Central American and Caribbean Games from 2010 to 2018.

Achievements

Pan Am Championships 
Women's singles

Central American and Caribbean Games 
Women's singles

Women's doubles

BWF International Challenge/Series 
Women's singles

Women's doubles

Mixed doubles

  BWF International Challenge tournament
  BWF International Series tournament
  BWF Future Series tournament

References

External links 
 

1993 births
Living people
Mexican female badminton players
Badminton players at the 2010 Summer Youth Olympics
Badminton players at the 2011 Pan American Games
Badminton players at the 2015 Pan American Games
Pan American Games competitors for Mexico
Competitors at the 2010 Central American and Caribbean Games
Competitors at the 2014 Central American and Caribbean Games
Competitors at the 2018 Central American and Caribbean Games
Central American and Caribbean Games gold medalists for Mexico
Central American and Caribbean Games silver medalists for Mexico
Central American and Caribbean Games bronze medalists for Mexico
Central American and Caribbean Games medalists in badminton
21st-century Mexican women